Greatest Nine is a series of baseball-themed sports video games developed by Sega CS and published by Sega. It began with the 1995 game Kanzen Chūkei Pro Yakyū Greatest Nine for the Sega Saturn. Its most recent entry is Baseball Advance (2002).

Overview

Greatest Nine began on the Sega Saturn in 1995. New releases in the series stopped for a while after 1998. However, it was revived in 2002 on the Game Boy Advance (GBA). This Game Boy Advance version has developed by Smilebit (absorbed by Sega in 2004), behind the Motto Pro Yakyuu Team o Tsukurou! franchise.

Games

Kanzen Chūkei Pro Yakyū Greatest Nine (1995)
Kanzen Chūkei Pro Yakyū Greatest Nine was developed to feature full Major League Baseball licensing for the American market. Next Generation reviewed the Saturn version of the game, rating it four stars out of five, and stated that "In the end, minus a few malfunctioning control features that Sega US promises to fix, Greatest Nine is an excellent sports title for the Saturn and an extremely encouraging sign of what's to come."

Greatest Nine '96 (1996)

Pro Yakyū Greatest Nine 97 (1997)

Pro Yakyū Greatest Nine 98 (1998)

Baseball Advance (2002)

A version of Greatest Nine was released for the Game Boy Advance in 2002, under the name Baseball Advance.

References

1995 video games
1996 video games
1997 video games
1998 video games
2002 video games
Game Boy Advance games
Baseball video games
Japan-exclusive video games
Sega video games
Video game franchises